Track of Thunder is a 1967 action drama film directed by Joseph Kane and starring Tommy Kirk. The film also stars Ray Stricklyn, H. M. Wynant, Brenda Benet, Faith Domergue, and Majel Barrett.

Plot
Gary and Bobby are two stock car drivers who grew up together and both love the same girl, Shelley. Fake newspaper articles by Georgina Clark start appearing highlighting a feud between them. At first Bobby and Gary ignore the reports but eventually the rivalry becomes genuine.

It turns out Georgina is in cahoots with Maxwell Carstairs, manager of the racetrack, who has been hired by a syndicate to turn the sport into a lucrative gambling venture; the articles are to increase attendances.

Bobby's mechanic, Bowser Smith, exposes the truth. Bobby refuses to drive Carstairs' car in the big race so Bowser replaces him and is killed.

Bobby quits racing and settles down on a farm with Shelley. Gary becomes a champion stock car racer. Gary's father marries Bobby's mother and Carstairs is arrested for embezzlement.

Cast
Tommy Kirk as Bobby Goodwin
Ray Stricklyn as Gary Regal
H. M. Wynant as Maxwell Carstairs
Brenda Benet as Shelley Newman
Faith Domergue as Mrs. Goodwin 
Majel Barrett as Georgia Clark 
Chet Stratton as Mr. Regal
James Dobson as Bowser Smith
Paul Crabtree as Mr. Bigelow 
Sam Tarpley as Colonel Lee

Production
Filming started in October 1966 and mostly took place around Nashville.

In real life, Tommy Kirk was a go-karting enthusiast. However he did not remember the movie fondly:
James Dobson was the other big star and he was a complete jerk... as far as I'm concerned, one of the most obtuse and insensitive people I've ever known in my life. I was fooling around with drugs at the time so I was about half awake in that film. I just sort of walked through it and took the money. I don't think it's a completely useless piece of trash like some of the other things I did, but it's not much of a film.

Reception

Critical response
Film critic Renata Adler of The New York Times called it a "tired, cliché-ridden little movie" which should "discourage any similar projects about stock-car racing for some time to come" and "probably will dampen the hopes of any youngsters intending to make a career of slamming around a speedway in a churning mass of autos. The film is that dull." However it did allow some of the racing footage was "okay. The cars move, in fact, miles ahead of the plot and most of the performances" and that "there is some quite, steady acting, in the standard role of a worried mother, by Faith Domergue—more real acting than the lady ever achieved in her glamour-girl heyday."

See also
List of American films of 1967

References

Citations

Sources

External links

1967 films
American auto racing films
Films shot in Tennessee
Films directed by Joseph Kane
1960s English-language films
1960s American films